Ege Özkayımoğlu (born 18 July 2001) is a Turkish professional footballer who plays as a forward for Afjet Afyonspor on loan from Göztepe.

Professional career
Özkayımoğlu is a youth product of Göztepe, having joined their academy in 2010. Özkayımoğlu made his professional debut in a 0-0 Süper Lig tie with Çaykur Rizespor on 15 September 2019.

References

External links

Profile
Mackolik Profile

2001 births
People from Konak
Living people
Turkish footballers
Turkey youth international footballers
Association football forwards
Göztepe S.K. footballers
1922 Konyaspor footballers
Süper Lig players
TFF First League players
TFF Second League players